Arthur Kett Barclay FRS, FRAS, FRGS, FGS (Bury Hill, Derbyshire, 20 June 1806 – 20 November 1869, Bury Hill, Dorking, Surrey) was a member of the Meteorological Society.

Biography

Early life
Barclay attended Harrow School after a period of private tutoring. At the age of twenty (in 1826) he joined Barclay, Perkins & Co. brewers of Southwark, London. He travelled through Europe between 1829 and 1833.

Marriage and children
Arthur married Maria Octavia Wright (ca. 1806–??) on an unknown date and had the following children.

Robert Barclay (1837–1913)
Reverend Charles Wright Barclay (1853–1926)

Astronomy
In 1848 Arthur Kett Barclay built his own astronomical observatory at Bury Hill, Dorking, Surrey. The revolving dome was made by Ransomes & May of Ipswich and the eight-inch (203mm) aperture refracting telescope was by Troughton & Simms of London

Philosophical and/or political views
Barclay supported the Conservative Party, but "would never consent to be brought forward as a candidate". He was also a magistrate and deputy lieutenant for the county of Surrey.

Published works

Honours, decorations, awards and distinctions
Fellow of the Geological Society from 1827
Master of the Worshipful Company of Brewers in 1840
Fellow of the Royal Geographical Society from 1840
Fellow of the Royal Astronomical Society from 1845
Member of the Meteorological Society from 1850
Fellow of the Royal Society from 1852

References/Notes

External links
 Dorking: Bury Hill and the Barclays

1806 births
1869 deaths
People educated at Harrow School
People from Dorking
English meteorologists
English geographers
19th-century British astronomers